Novara Nord is a railway station in Italy. It is the end of the Saronno–Novara railway.

It serves the city of Novara, and is joined by a junction track to the Novara railway station, managed by Ferrovie dello Stato.

Services 
Novara Nord is served by the regional trains operated by the lombard railway company Trenord.

See also 
 Novara railway station

References

External links 

Railway stations in Piedmont
Ferrovienord stations
Railway stations opened in 1887
Railway stations opened in 2005